David Viñas (July 28, 1927 – March 10, 2011) was an Argentine dramatist, critic, and novelist.

Life and career 
Viñas was born and raised in Buenos Aires, and enrolled in the University of Buenos Aires, becoming head of the Argentine University Federation student organization. He published his first novel in 1955, and first came to wide attention when he won the Gerchunoff Prize for his novel Un Dios Cotidiano (1957). He received the National Prize for Jauria (1971). The following year, his play Lisandro won the National Prize for Theater.

Viñas' work centers on Argentine history, and generally does not partake of the magical realism favored by many of his contemporaries. He is deeply concerned with Argentina's legacy of authoritarianism and the problems posed by the nature and historical dominance of the Argentine military. Two of his children disappeared during the 1976-83 military regime, and he spent that era in exile, returning to Argentina in 1984.

He was an early mentor of critic and essayist Beatriz Sarlo, although he adhered to a more traditional leftist position than did Sarlo in later years. Following the election of left-wing Peronist Néstor Kirchner in 2003, he became a vocal supporter of his, and in 2008 co-founded Carta Abierta ("Open Letter") with journalist Horacio Verbitsky, an informal think tank of left-wing public figures in literature, journalism and academia who regularly publish opinion columns in defense of Kirchnerism.

Viñas directed the Institute of Argentine Literature at his Alma Mater.

References

Further reading 
Argentina's Jewish Short Story Writers, Rita M. Gardiol, 1986.

External links 
 David Viñas at literatura.org

1927 births
2011 deaths
People from Buenos Aires
Argentine people of Spanish descent
University of Buenos Aires alumni
Academic staff of the University of Buenos Aires
Latin Americanists
Argentine male novelists
Argentine dramatists and playwrights
Members of Carta Abierta
Male dramatists and playwrights
20th-century Argentine novelists
20th-century dramatists and playwrights